Jim "The Great" (1850 – c. 1897), born Bow-os-loh, was an Apache Indian scout in the U.S. Army who served under Lieutenant Colonel George Crook during the Apache Wars. He guided cavalry troopers against renegade Apaches in the Arizona Territory during Crook's winter campaign of 1872-73 and was one of ten scouts later awarded the Medal of Honor for gallantry.

Biography
Born Bow-os-loh in the Arizona Territory, Jim was a member of the White Mountain Apache. In late-1872, he and nine other Apaches were hired by the U.S. Army as an Indian scout for Lieutenant Colonel George Crook's campaign against renegades still active in Arizona following the surrender of Cochise earlier that year. Jim and the other scouts guided cavalry troopers in the Tonto Basin where the Western Apache and Yavapais had been successfully conducting raids and eluding troops for several years. During Crook's winter campaign of 1872–73, Jim was cited for gallantry battling the Apache in the mountains. Of the 23 men who received the Medal of Honor, Jim and all 10 Indian scouts received the award for "gallant conduct during campaigns and engagements with Apaches". The other scouts included William Alchesay, Blanquet, Chiquito, Elsatsoosu, Kelsay, Kosoha, Machol, Nannasaddie and Nantaje. Most of the Apache scouts, save for William Alchesay, disappeared from public record soon after the expedition. The death of Jim was not reported until 40 years later when his widow applied for his army pension in 1927.

See also

List of Medal of Honor recipients for the Indian Wars

References

Further reading
Konstantin, Phil. This Day in North American Indian History: Important Dates in the History of North America's Native Peoples for Every Calendar Day. New York: Da Capo Press, 2002. 
Radbourne, Allan. Mickey Free: Apache Captive, Interpreter, and Indian Scout. Tucson: Arizona Historical Society, 2005.

External links
 at Army Knowledge Online

1850 births
1890s deaths
White Mountain Apache people
Native American people of the Indian Wars
Native American United States military personnel
United States Army Medal of Honor recipients
People of the Arizona Territory
United States Army soldiers
United States Army Indian Scouts
American Indian Wars recipients of the Medal of Honor